James Martin Tandy (born 16 January 1981) is a former English cricketer. Tandy was a right-handed batsman. He was born at Wolverhampton, Staffordshire.

In 2000, he represented the Worcestershire Cricket Board in 2 List A matches against the Kent Cricket Board in the 2000 NatWest Trophy and Staffordshire in the 2001 Cheltenham & Gloucester Trophy. In his 2 List A matches, he scored a single run at a batting average of 0.50.

References

External links
James Tandy at Cricinfo
James Tandy at CricketArchive

1981 births
Living people
Cricketers from Wolverhampton
English cricketers
Worcestershire Cricket Board cricketers